Polygrammodes phaeocraspis is a moth in the family Crambidae. It was described by George Hampson in 1913. It is found in Peru.

References

Spilomelinae
Moths described in 1913
Moths of South America